This is an incomplete list of paintings by Mikhail Nesterov (1862–1942).

All paintings are described as 'oil on canvas' except where stated otherwise.

Nesterov